Esmond is a historic mill village in Smithfield, Providence County, Rhode Island, United States. Old County Road School, East Smithfield Public Library, and the historic Allenville Mill are located in the village.

Located in Esmond is the former Esmond Mill, which operated from 1906 to 1948. After its closure, the Esmond Mill became the corporate headquarters for Benny's.

Esmond has its own postal code: 02917-2808.

References

External links

 East Smithfield Public Library

Villages in Providence County, Rhode Island
Providence metropolitan area
Villages in Rhode Island